Charles Hugo may refer to:

 Charles-Hyacinthe Hugo (1667–1739), French Premonstratensian author
 Charles Hugo (sailor), French sailor who competed in the 1900 Summer Olympics
 Charles Hugo (writer) (1826–1871), French writer, son to Victor Hugo
 Chad Hugo (Charles Edward Hugo, born 1974), American multi-instrumentalist and record producer